The American University of Science and Technology (AUST) is a private, non-sectarian, and co-educational American university in Lebanon.

It was established in 1989 in Beirut, under the name of the American Universal College of Decree Number 4897, as an External Degree Program from the State University of New York, through its School for Graduate Studies, Empire State College, in the state of New York, United States. However, in 2000, it became a private, non-sectarian and co-educational institution of higher learning licensed by the Lebanese Presidential Decree of Number 3585. Then in 2007, the institute was licensed as "The American University of Science and Technology" acquiesced in Lebanese Governmental Decree of Number 677.

The university offers programs leading to degrees in Business and Economics, Arts and Sciences, Health Sciences and Engineering. As of March 2019, the university has four campuses, one is in Beirut and the other three are in the cities of Aley, Sidon and Zahlé. Since establishing the university's French Section, the university has been encouraging trilingualism of English, French and Arabic environment and cultural entourage.

History

The American University of Science and Technology was founded in 1989, as an External Degree Program from the State University of New York through its School for Graduate Studies, Empire State College in the state of New York, United States,  Decree Number 4897 under the name of the American Universal College, by Dr. Hiam Sakr in Alfred Naccache street in Beirut.

The educational institute later changed its name on March 21, 1994, to the American University of Science and Technology. And, on August 7, 2000, it became a private, non-sectarian and co-educational institution of higher learning licensed by the Lebanese Presidential Decree of Number 3585. In 2007, the institute was licensed as a university acquiesced in Lebanese Governmental Decree of Number 677. Nonetheless, Boutros Harb was elected as the head of the Board Of Directors of the university.

The university offers both Undergraduate and Graduate courses and degrees in most of its departments. Its medium of instruction is both in English and French.

Campus
The American University of Science and Technology has three campuses: The Main campus is located in Ashrafieh area in Beirut, Lebanon, of Land space: 10,000 m2  and an existing buildings: 12,245 m2. The 
Zahlé campus is located on Mouallaka Avenue in Bekaa, East Lebanon, of land space: 8,000 m2 and an existing buildings: 6,000 m2. While the Sidon campus is located at Sindon's northern entrance, Nazih Bizri Boulevard, South Lebanon, of land space: 7,245 m2 and an existing buildings: 3,725 m2.

Garden of Genius
On October 11, 2010, the university had held a commemorating ceremony in the presence of the renowned poet, Said Akl during which he unveiled his own statue at the "Garden of Genius" in the university campus, in Beirut, in the presence of scores of dignitaries, literary figures, religious leaders, politicians and diplomats.

Faculties
As of March 31, 2011, the Faculty of Business and Economics received the accreditation of International Assembly for Collegiate Business Education for its business programs.

The business programs in the following degrees, as well, are accredited by the International Assembly for Collegiate Business Education: Master of Business Administration (MBA) and Bachelor's degree of Science in business administration.

Nevertheless, on September 7, 2016, the Faculty of Science received the accreditation of the Accreditation Board for Engineering and Technology, Inc (ABET), for its Engineering and Computer Science programs.

Faculty of Arts and Sciences

The Faculty of arts and sciences consists of seven academic departments...

Faculty of Business and Economics
The Faculty of business and economics offers programs leading to the bachelor's degree in the following fields of specialization: accounting, economics, finance, hospitality management, management, management information systems, marketing, travel and tourism management, and marketing and advertising. In addition, the Faculty offers a graduate program leading to the Master of Business Administration (MBA) with the following fields of concentration: accounting, economics, finance, management, hospitality management, management information systems and marketing.

Faculty of Health Sciences
AUST has also decided to participate actively in the development and spreading of biotechnology in Lebanon and the Middle East region by creating the Department of Laboratory Science and Technology. At present, the department offers two biotechnology tracks: the Clinical Laboratory Science and Optics and Optometry. In both tracks the student will enroll in a BS program followed by an optional year of specialty program.

Faculty of Engineering

Accreditation and Affiliations

There are more than 33 affiliations covering the areas of transfer of credits, academic curricula, and the exchange of students, exchange of faculty and technical training. Moreover, in 2018, AUST has received an institutional accreditation from Evalag (Evaluation Agency of Baden-Württemberg), member of the European Association for Quality Assurance in Higher Education. The university's affiliations include:

North America
United States: University of North Carolina (Established 1789 in North Carolina)
United States: Ohio University (Established 1804 in Ohio)
United States: Villanova University (Established 1842 in Pennsylvania)
United States: University of Kentucky (Established 1865 in Kentucky)
United States: University of California (Established 1868 in California)
United States: University of California, Berkeley (Established 1868 in California)
United States: University of Arkansas (Established 1871 in Arkansas)
United States: New Jersey Institute of Technology (Established 1881 in New Jersey)
United States: Keuka College (Established 1890 in New York)
United States: American Hotel and Lodging Association (Established 1910 in Washington, D.C.)
United States: State University of New York-Empire State College (Established 1971 in New York)
Canada: École Polytechnique de Montréal (Established 1873 in Montreal)
Canada: Concordia University (Established 1974 in Montreal)
Europe

France: Université Catholique de Lille (Established 1875 in Lille)
France: École nationale supérieure de création industrielle (Established 1982 in Paris)
France: Université de Versailles Saint-Quentin-en-Yvelines (Established 1991 in Versailles)
Switzerland: Unievrsité de Lausanne (Established 1537 in Lausanne)
Switzerland: César Ritz Colleges Switzerland (Established 1982 in Lucerne)
Italy: Politecnico di Milano (Established 1863 in Milano)
Italy: Università degli Studi di Firenze (Established 1321 in Florence)
Italy: Università Ca' Foscari Venezia (Established 1868 in Venice)
Italy: Università degli Studi di Urbino "Carlo Bo" (Established 1506 in Urbino)
Germany: Bremen University of Applied Sciences (Established 1982 in Bremen)
Germany: Evalag (Evaluationsagentur Baden-Württemberg) (Established 2000 in Baden-Württemberg)
Spain: Universitat Politècnica de València (Established 1971 in Valencia)
Bulgaria: The University of Sofia (St. Kliment Ohridski) (Established 1888 in Sofia)
Poland: Collegium Civitas (Established 1997 in Warsaw)
Portugal: University of Coimbra (Established 1290 in Coimbra)
Ukraine: Lviv Polytechnic National University (Established 1844 in Lviv)
Asia
Lebanon: Lebanese University (Established 1951 in Beirut)
Jordan: The Hashemite University (Established 1995 in Zarqa)
China: South China University of Technology (Established 1952 in Guangzhou)
Africa
Algeria: University of Algiers (Established 1909 in Algiers)
Egypt: Assiut University (Established 1957 in Assiut)
Egypt: Tanta University (Established 1972 in Tanta)

Academics

Admission
The American University of Science and Technology application forms are available at the Admission Offices in the university campuses in Beirut, Zahlé and Sidon. Applications, upon request, shall be sent to the applicant's home or school address or even the application forms can be submitted online on the university's website.

Applications for admission to AUST must be submitted before the end of September for admission to the Fall semester, before the end of January for admission to the Spring semester and before the end of June for admission to the Summer session.

Libraries
The AUST University Library System is centered in each of every campus and it comprises nearly three individual libraries.

Student life

Athletics
The AUST sport activities office gives students the opportunity to socialize, organize events, and work in teams within areas of Interest, which are not necessarily academic.

In sport activities office there are several sports and activities such as: Rugby, aerobics, football, basketball, handball, volleyball, Aikido, Tae Kwon Do, Dance de Salon (ballroom dance), dancesport, chess, Thai-kick boxing, Crazy Dunkers, Hip Hop, Yoga and tennis.

Team spirit, fair competition and sportsmanship run high at AUST's men and women varsity squads. The basketball, football, handball, volleyball, rugby teams participate in various local, regional and international collegiate tournaments, getting exposed not only to high level competition but also memorable experience.

Student clubs

Student clubs are established to promote the various interests of AUST students. These clubs are supported by the university. Each student club has a full-time faculty advisor who accompanies the members to all of their organized activities. The activities of these clubs are run according to sound business practices.

The Student Life council reviews all requests for student activities by the various student clubs. In the event that an approved club activity falls short financially, the Student Activities Fund may be used to cover the deficit.

The AUST clubs, in 2015, include, but are not limited to the following clubs:
 Environmental Club, 
 First Aid Club, 
 Music Club, 
 Photography Club, 
 Drama Club, and
 Chess Club

Honorary doctorates 
During each graduation ceremony, the university awards degrees in ad honorem to distinguished personalities' contributions to a specific field or to the society in general. The following is a list of Lebanese, Arab and international personalities that the American University of Science and Technology has awarded:

 Amine Gemayel, (awarded 2019) former president of Lebanon from 1982 to 1988
 Bahia Hariri, (awarded 2010) politician and former minister
 Boutros Harb, (awarded 2017) politician and former minister
 Ghassan Tueni, (awarded 2011) journalist, politician and diplomat who headed An Nahar Newspaper
 Giancarlo Spinelli, (awarded 2017) president of the European Association for International Education
 Hamad Saeed Sultan Al Shamsi, (awarded 2019) United Arab Emirates' Ambassador to Lebanon
 Khalaf Ahmed Al Habtoor, (awarded 2005) chairman of the Al Habtoor Group
 Leila Al Solh, (awarded 2009) vice president of Alwaleed bin Talal Humanitarian Foundation and former minister
 May Chidiac, (awarded 2016) journalist and former minister
 Mouna Elias Hraoui, (awarded 2014) former First Lady of Lebanon
 Rev. Kail C. Ellis, (awarded 2015) assistant to the President of Villanova University
 Saad Hariri, (awarded 2018) former Prime Minister of Lebanon
 Salim Georges Sfeir, (awarded 2018) banker and financier, chairman and Chief Executive of Bank of Beirut

Notable alumni
American University of Science and Technology list of notable alumni includes:
Serena Shim, American journalist. The Serena Shim Award for Uncompromised Integrity in Journalism was launched to honor her.
Ali Hashem, columnist for Al-Monitor and BBC Arabic's bilingual Iran affairs correspondent. He previously served as Al Mayadeen news network's chief correspondent. Until March 2012, he was Al Jazeera's war correspondent, and prior to that he was a senior journalist at the BBC. Ali has written for several international Institutes and media outlets, such as The Guardian, the Sunday Times, the Middle East Institute, the Century Foundation, Carnegie Foundation, among others. In the Arab world Ali wrote for Lebanese daily As Safir, the Egyptian dailies Al-Masry Al-Youm and Aldostor and the Jordanian daily Alghad.
Layal Abboud, pop singer, folk music entertainer, sound-lyric poet, concert dancer, fit model and humanitarian.
Dana Halabi, singer and model.

See also
State University of New York
Empire State College
American University of Beirut
American University in Dubai
American University of Sharjah
Université Saint-Joseph de Beyrouth
Achrafieh
Serena Shim

References

External links
 

 
Education in Beirut
Science and technology in Lebanon
Scientific organisations based in Lebanon
1989 establishments in Asia